Malabar is a French brand of chewing gum, launched in 1958 by Kréma. It is since 2017 owned by Eurazeo.

Famous for their long-running series of advertisements they first launched in 1958, it was not until 1969 that the now famous blond man wearing a yellow jersey on his chest and wearing an M surrounded by a red oval came to represent the brand. The figure, created by the designer Jean-Claude Poirier, is no longer the central part of the advertisements but is still present on the packaging of the gum.

References

External links 
 Carambar&Co

French confectionery
French brands